Jerahl Hughes (born 10 August 1989) is an English footballer who plays as a winger.

The winger, born in Brighton, was a product of Crystal Palace's youth academy, and played a major role in their run in the FA Youth Cup in 2007. In March 2007 he was taken on trial by Yeovil Town, and the Somerset club signed him permanently for the 2007–08 season. At Yeovil, however,  he was restricted to just one appearance in the Football League, and was eventually loaned out to Worthing before being released at the end of the season. He was subsequently signed by Andy Hessenthaler, manager of Dover Athletic, after a successful trial. However, after travelling issues took their toll, Hughes left Dover by mutual consent in December 2009.

External links

1989 births
Living people
Footballers from Brighton
English footballers
Association football wingers
Crystal Palace F.C. players
Yeovil Town F.C. players
Worthing F.C. players
Dover Athletic F.C. players
Whitehawk F.C. players
WaiBOP United players
Hamilton Wanderers players
English Football League players
National League (English football) players
Isthmian League players
New Zealand Football Championship players